This Town is an upcoming six-part British television series for BBC One. It is written and created by Steven Knight and directed by Paul Whittington. It is produced by Kudos and Nebulastar and co-produced by Universal Music Group’s Mercury Studios. Music is written for the series by Dan Carey and Kate Tempest. Cast members include Michelle Dockery,Geraldine James, David Dawson, Jordan Bolger and Nicholas Pinnock.

Synopsis
In 1981 ska and two-tone music is uniting some black, white and Asian youths in the streets and estates of the West Midlands where an extended family and four young people are drawn into the world of music through the context of ongoing social unrest.

Cast
 Michelle Dockery
 Geraldine James 
 David Dawson
 Nicholas Pinnock
 Manoj Annand
 Jordan Bolger
 Eve Austin
 Ben Rose
 Mark de Freitas
 Matt Backhouse
 Levi Brown
 Luke Hughes
 Séainín Brennan

Production

Development
Knight and producer Nick Angel began working in November 2020 with the production companies Kudos and Stigma on a project set during the early 1980s UK music scene.
A six-part series was commissioned by BBC One in April 2022. 

The series was previously under the working title Two Tone. Knight has said the title This Town is a reference to the song Ghost Town by The Specials which spent three weeks at number one in the UK singles chart in 1981. For Knight, it is a project he has said is more personal work to him than his previous West Midlands based television series Peaky Blinders , with Knight describing This Town as his “love letter” to the area he grew up in and “an era I loved through and know well and [involving] characters who I feel I grew up with.”

Casting
Michelle Dockery, David Dawson and Nicholas Pinnock were announced to be cast in November 2022, it was also revealed that original music would be written specifically for the series by Dan Carey and Kae Tempest. That same month Séainín Brennan was added to the cast. It was later reported that the main roles in the series would be played by Levi Brown, Jordan Bolger, Ben Rose and Eve Austin.

Filming
Principal photography started in Birmingham in November 2022 on location in the city and at Knight’s Loc. Film and TV Studios. Filming locations also included Wolverhampton where a reported race riot was filmed.  A casting call for extras to play skinheads was put in the local media and music press.

References

External links

2023 British television series debuts
2020s British drama television series
2020s British television miniseries
Black British television shows
Television shows filmed in England
Television series set in the 1980s
Television shows set in Warwickshire
Television shows set in the West Midlands (county)
BBC television dramas
Television series set in 1981
Television shows set in Birmingham, West Midlands
Television series about families
Television series created by Steven Knight